General Sir James Vaughan Jackson, GCB, KH (1790 – 31 December 1871) was an Irish officer in the British Army.

Military career
He was born the third son of Colonel George Jackson, of Carramore House, Ballina, Co. Mayo, an M.P. for Co. Mayo in both the Irish and UK parliaments and his wife Maria Rutledge, daughter of William Rutledge of Foxford.

James Jackson joined the British Army as an ensign in the 83rd Foot. He was deployed for service in the Peninsula War in 1809. He received a War Medal with 9 clasps for his participation at the Battle of Bussaco in September 1810, Battle of Fuentes de Oñoro in May 1811, Siege of Ciudad Rodrigo in January 1812, Siege of Badajoz in March 1812, Battle of Salamanca in July 1812, Battle of Vitoria in June 1813, Battle of the Pyrenees in July 1813, Battle of Nivelle in November 1813 and Battle of the Nive in December 1813.

He then took part in the Battle of Waterloo and from 1819 to 1826 served in India and Arabia. He was promoted Major in the 6th Dragoon Guards in 1827 and Lieutenant–Colonel in 1850. He was Commander-in-Chief in the Cape of Good Hope from 1854 to 1859.

In 1856 he was given the colonelcy of the 6th (Inniskilling) Dragoons, transferring in 1860 to the 6th Dragoon Guards and again in 1868 to the 1st Dragoon Guards, a position he held until his death. On 6 February 1865 Jackson was promoted to full General.

He was awarded the K.H. in 1837, K.C.B. in 1856 and G.C.B. in 1865.

He died at Westwood, Whalley Range, Manchester on 31 December 1871.

References

External links
 19th Century Photos

|-

|-

1790 births
1871 deaths
1st King's Dragoon Guards officers
6th (Inniskilling) Dragoons officers
83rd (County of Dublin) Regiment of Foot officers
19th-century Anglo-Irish people
British Army generals
British Army personnel of the Peninsular War
Carabiniers (6th Dragoon Guards) officers
Irish officers in the British Army
Knights Grand Cross of the Order of the Bath
Military personnel from County Mayo
Recipients of the Waterloo Medal